The Cruelest Month, by Louise Penny, is the third novel in the Three Pines Mysteries series, which feature Inspector Armand Gamache.

Plot summary

The novel, set in the small Canadian town of Three Pines, takes place around the Easter season.  A group of friends visits a haunted house, hoping to rid it of the evil spirits that have haunted it, and the village, for decades.  One of them ends up dead, apparently of fright.  Chief Inspector Armand Gamache and his team from the Sûreté du Québec investigate the old house and the villagers of Three Pines.

Awards and recognition

The Cruelest Month was the recipient of the Agatha Award for best novel of 2008.

It was also nominated for the Anthony Award, the Macavity Award and the Barry Award for best novel of 2008

References

External links
 The Cruelest Month Official Macmillan Page
 Review by The Library Journal

2008 Canadian novels
Novels by Louise Penny
Agatha Award-winning works
Novels set in Quebec